Brotherhood among the Sahaba refers to the time after the Hijra [Muhammad's migration from Mecca to Medina] when the Islamic prophet Muhammad instituted brotherhood between the emigrants (Muhajirun) and the natives of Medina, the Ansar (literally "helpers"), and he chose Ali as his own brother.

Brothers
Muhammad - Ali ibn Abi Talib
Abu Bakr - Khaarijah bin Zaid bin abi Zuhair al-Ansari
Umar - Utban ibn Malik
Uthman - Aus ibn Thabit
Ja`far ibn Abī Tālib - Muadh ibn Jabal
Abdur Rahman bin Awf - Saad ibn Rabi Aqbi Badri
Talhah - Kab bin Malik
Mus`ab ibn `Umair - Abu Ayub Aqbi
Ammar ibn Yasir - Huzaifa ibn Alaiman
Abu Darda - Salman the Persian
Manzar ibn Umar - Abu Dharr al-Ghifari
Muhammad ibn Maslamah - Abu Ubaidah ibn al Jarrah

References

+Brotherhood
Alevism

History of Islam